Heidi Marianne Pelttari (born 2 August 1985) is a Finnish retired ice hockey defenceman and member of the Finnish national ice hockey team. She represented Finland in the women's ice hockey tournament at both the 2006 and 2010 Winter Olympic Games. 

Pelttari was a stand out defensemen for the Minnesota Duluth Bulldogs women's ice hockey program and played her club career with the Tampereen Ilves of the Naisten SM-sarja.

Career stats

Minnesota Duluth
Note: GP= Games played; G= Gaols; AST= Assists; PTS = Points; PPG = Power Play Goals; SHG = Short handed Goals

Finland

References

External links 
 
 
 

1985 births
Living people
Ice hockey people from Tampere
Finnish women's ice hockey defencemen
Ilves Naiset players
Ice hockey players at the 2006 Winter Olympics
Ice hockey players at the 2010 Winter Olympics
Medalists at the 2010 Winter Olympics
Minnesota Duluth Bulldogs women's ice hockey players
Olympic bronze medalists for Finland
Olympic ice hockey players of Finland
Olympic medalists in ice hockey